Bryum pseudotriquetrum, commonly known as marsh bryum, is a species of moss belonging to the family Bryaceae.

It has cosmopolitan distribution. There are two subspecies, Bryum pseudotriquetrum var. pseudotriquetrum and Bryum pseudotriquetrum var. bimum. 
 
The moss has an acrocarpous growth form. The shoots form green to reddish or brown tufts and patches that can grow to be several centimetres tall. The stems are often reddish. The green to yellowish-green leaves are equally spaced along the stem, are 2–5 mm long, have a border of narrow reddish cells, and have a thick nerve that is usually shortly excurrent. Leaves are oblong-lanceolate to ovate-lanceolate. The leaves are contorted when dry and erect-spreading when wet. Most plants have leaves with a base that runs down onto the stem, although this feature is not always well-developed. The lower parts the stems are covered with a brownish red mat of rhizoids. The pendulous or inclined capsules are frequent, 2.5-4 mm long, and borne on a seta 2–3 cm long. The capsules are brown when they mature in summer or autumn.

References

pseudotriquetrum